Krists Neilands (born 18 August 1994) is a Latvian cyclist, who currently rides for UCI WorldTeam .

Career

Israel Cycling Academy (2017–present)
In 2017, Kuldīga-born Neilands won the Latvian National Road Race Championships, and stage 5 at the Tour d'Azerbaïdjan. At the 2018 Milan–San Remo, Neilands attacked on the famous Poggio di San Remo climb. He got a small gap to the peloton with Vincenzo Nibali; however, Neilands could not keep up with Nibali, who later won the race, while Neilands finished 23rd. In May 2018, he was named in the startlist for the 2018 Giro d'Italia. He finished the race 73rd overall. In August 2020, he was named in the startlist for the 2020 Tour de France.

Major results

2011
 2nd Time trial, National Junior Road Championships
2012
 1st  Overall Tour de la Région de Lódz
1st Stage 2
 National Junior Road Championships
2nd Time trial
3rd Road race
2013
 National Road Championships
3rd Under-23 road race
5th Road race
2014
 1st  Time trial, National Under-23 Road Championships
 8th Memoriał Henryka Łasaka
2015
 National Road Championships
1st  Under-23 road race
1st  Under-23 time trial
2nd Road race
 1st Stage 3 Tour of Borneo
 5th Overall Podlasie Tour
1st  Young rider classification
 5th Overall Tour of Hainan
 5th Overall GP Liberty Seguros
 8th Velothon Wales
2016
 National Road Championships
1st  Under-23 time trial
5th Road race
 5th Overall Carpathian Couriers Race
 5th Ronde van Vlaanderen Beloften
 8th Overall Baltic Chain Tour
 10th Liège–Bastogne–Liège Espoirs
2017
 National Road Championships
1st  Road race
3rd Time trial
 1st Stage 5 Tour d'Azerbaïdjan
 6th Overall Okolo Slovenska
 8th Overall Baltic Chain Tour
 10th Overall Volta a Portugal
1st  Young rider classification
2018
 National Road Championships
1st  Road race
4th Time trial
 1st Dwars door het Hageland
 3rd Prueba Villafranca de Ordizia
 7th GP Industria & Artigianato di Larciano
 9th Overall Herald Sun Tour
2019
 National Road Championships
1st  Time trial
4th Road race
 1st  Overall Tour de Hongrie
1st  Mountains classification
1st Stages 2 & 4
 1st Grand Prix de Wallonie
 2nd Overall Vuelta a Asturias
 3rd Overall Arctic Race of Norway
1st  Young rider classification
2020
  Combativity award Stage 4 Tour de France
2021
 6th GP Miguel Induráin
2022
 2nd Time trial, National Road Championships
 7th Overall Tour de Hongrie
2023
 5th Grand Prix La Marseillaise

General classification results timeline

References

External links

1994 births
Living people
Latvian male cyclists
People from Ventspils
Olympic cyclists of Latvia
Cyclists at the 2020 Summer Olympics